Fateless may refer to:

 Fatelessness or Fateless, a 1975 novel by Imre Kertész
 Fateless (film), a 2005 Hungarian film, based on the novel
 Fateless (album), a 2017 album by Coldrain
 Fateless Records, a Los Angeles, California-based independent record label